The 2011 Georgia Southern Eagles team represented Georgia Southern University in the 2011 NCAA Division I FCS football season. The Eagles were led by second-year head coach Jeff Monken and played their home games at Paulson Stadium. They are a member of the Southern Conference. They finished the season 11–3, 7–1 in Southern Conference play, winning the conference championship outright. They received the conference's automatic bid into the FCS playoffs where they defeated Old Dominion in the second round and Maine in the quarterfinals before falling to North Dakota State in the semifinals.

Rankings
On November 13, 2011 they received one vote in the AP Top 25 poll.

Schedule

References

Georgia Southern
Georgia Southern Eagles football seasons
Southern Conference football champion seasons
Georgia Southern Eagles football
2011 in sports in Georgia (U.S. state)